Kraselov is a municipality and village in Strakonice District in the South Bohemian Region of the Czech Republic. It has about 200 inhabitants.

Administrative parts
Villages of Lhota u Svaté Anny, Milčice and Mladotice are administrative parts of Kraselov.

Galery

References

Villages in Strakonice District